Patriarch Germanus may refer to:

 Germanus I of Constantinople, Ecumenical Patriarch in 715–730
 Germanus I, Patriarch of Bulgaria c. 972 – c. 990
 Germanus II of Constantinople, Ecumenical Patriarch in 1223–1240
 Germanus III of Constantinople, Ecumenical Patriarch in 1266
 Germanus IV of Constantinople, Ecumenical Patriarch in 1842–1845 and 1852–1853
 Germanus V of Constantinople, Ecumenical Patriarch in 1913–1918